Percy Harrison may refer to:

 Percy Harrison (footballer) (1902–?), English footballer
 Percy Harrison (cricketer) (1878–1935), English cricketer